The abolitionist John Brown (1800–1859) was executed on Friday, December 2, 1859, for murder, treason against the Commonwealth of Virginia, and for having led an unsuccessful and bloody attempt to start a slave insurrection. He was tried and hanged in Charles Town, Virginia (since 1863, West Virginia). He was the first person executed for treason in the history of the country.

His body was taken by his widow Mary Brown home to his farm in North Elba, New York, and buried there on December 8, 1859.

Background

Brown was, at the time of his execution, the most famous living American: emblem for the North, as Wendell Phillips put it,  a mad traitor in the South. His trial was the first in which there was national newspaper coverage, using the still-new telegraph. Reporters and sketch artists were sent to cover the trial. Newspapers and magazines carried many articles on it.

The John Brown affair is the last major event leading up to the Civil War. In fact the Governor of Virginia Henry A. Wise, who was very much involved, thought that the Civil War could begin in 1859 in Charles Town. He moved, at considerable expense, as many Virginia militia as possible to Charles Town, which was said to resemble a military camp.

What to do with John Brown's body was a question of national significance. A modern scholar called the journey of his corpse "a media event of the highest order." Union soldiers sang "John Brown's Body" as they marched during the war.

Dissection by medical students

Dr. W. C. Hicks, of the New Orleans School of Medicine, offered, in a letter to Governor Wise, to pay Virginia $500 for Brown's remains, to be used for dissection by medical students. He also pledged that once the skeleton was "properly dried and arranged", he would exhibit it throughout New England, not for money, but to "frighten every Scoundrel Abolitionist out of the country". "The medical faculty of Richmond College" also requested, on November 2, "the bodies of such as may be executed." Wise instead had the body released to Mary Ann Day Brown, John's widow, who was awaiting it in Harpers Ferry to take it home for burial. It was the corpse of a son of Brown (only much later identified as Watson) that was turned into an anatomical specimen, with a note saying it was a message to abolitionists (see Burning of Winchester Medical College). The corpses of three other members of Brown's party—Shields Green, John Anthony Copeland Jr., and Jeremiah Anderson—were also used by medical students.

Other proposals
The Richmond Examiner proposed that Brown's body be “chopped into small pieces, in the Chinese manner, and distributed in terrorem all over the land."

Brown wanted his body and those of his sons and the two Thompson boys burned, which he said would be much less expensive than burial, but that was not allowed in Virginia, the Sheriff said, and Mrs. Brown did not want it either. Also, she did not feel up to identifying the partially decomposed body of Oliver, dead for over a month. She rejected the repeated suggestion of Wendell Phillips, Lydia Maria Child, and others that John be buried "with impressive funeral solemnities" in Mount Auburn Cemetery in Cambridge, Massachusetts, with the erection of a monument. Also she rejected proposals to pack his body in ice, with the rope around his neck, and exhibit it in "all our principal cities and even the minor ones."

The trip to North Elba

Harpers Ferry to Rutland, Vermont
Despite the "great propaganda value" of these proposed measures, Mary set off early Saturday morning, December 3, on the one daily Baltimore and Ohio express train for Baltimore—the same one Brown stopped on October 16, and Robert E. Lee took home on October 19—with her husband's body. She was accompanied by James Miller McKim and Hector Tyndale. In Baltimore she changed trains for Philadelphia, arriving about 12:30 pm. Mary intended to stop there, rest, and have the body prepared by an undertaker, "but the prospect of the body's approach produced such an excitement in that city...that the Mayor believed it would be impossible, if the body should remain," to maintain public order. Accompanied by many policemen, he met the train. Although most of the crowd awaiting its arrival consisted of sympathetic Blacks, the Mayor took a long tool box from a baggage car, covered it, and had it taken away quickly, the crowd following the sham coffin. Brown's body was taken immediately by ferry to Camden, New Jersey, and from there via the Camden & Amboy Railroad to South Amboy, New Jersey. A Quaker undertaker, Jacob M. Hopper, met the ferry from South Amboy to New York at the ferry port, The Battery. Although Hopper's studio was in Brooklyn, he rented briefly a room at another funeral establishment, McGraw and Taylor, at 163 Bowery, in Manhattan. There is a historic marker. There he removed the body from the plain coffin it came in, washed it, dressed it, and placed it in a  walnut coffin. A small crowd gathered outside the establishment. After resting Saturday night in Philadelphia Mrs. Brown continued to New York on Sunday, spending the night there with friends.

At 7 AM on Monday the 5th, Mrs. Brown, described as "quite unwell", McKim, Richard P. Hallowell, and the coffin proceeded north on the Hudson River Railroad, the oak coffin having been placed inside a pine box. They were accompanied  by a reporter from the New-York Tribune and Thomas Nast, a sketch artist for Harper's and the New York Illustrated Weekly. Church bells rang and crowds gathered as they proceeded up the Hudson to Troy, New York, where they were joined by Wendell Phillips, arriving from Boston with the hope of bringing Brown's body to Boston for burial in Mount Auburn Cemetery. An impromptu announcement said this was not going to happen, since Brown had wanted to be buried at his farm. Waiting for the next train they stopped briefly at the American House hotel, where John had often stayed, and whose manager said he had been offered "tempting prices" for the signatures in his register. Another train took them to Rutland, Vermont, where they spent Monday night.

Rutland to North Elba

From 2002 to 2005 a yearly excursion retraced this most difficult part of the trip. In 2005 a guidebook to the route was published.

On Tuesday morning, December 6, the party continued by train to Vergennes, from which a ferry crossed Lake Champlain. 75 citizens escorted the party to the border of the city, standing in two lines with uncovered heads as the coffin passed by. A "procession of carriages" escorted them to the lake shore, with church bells ringing, and they boarded the ferry, which altered its normal docking point on the New York side to leave them closer to their destination.

A wagon awaited them at Westport, New York, and took them to Elizabethtown over an abandoned plank road, described as  "excessively rough and unpleasant". Tuesday night, December 6, was spent at Adam's Hotel in Elizabethtown, New York. Brown's body lay in state at the Essex County Courthouse, with an honor guard of six men, chief among them Orlando Kellogg, "who never tired of telling the story of that December night". Wendell Phillips gave an impromptu talk of almost two hours on Brown's failed raid, his trial, and his execution. There is a historical marker, and in the Courthouse, since 1923, a painting of John Brown on trial.

The next day, December 7, the casket and the party, in two wagons, made the "most arduous trip"  to Brown's farm. Everyone had to get off the wagons and walk for part of the day, to lighten the load on the horses. The descent was even more dangerous than the ascent. From Keene to North Elba they went via what is today (2021) called Old Mountain Road, not via Indian Pass, as Young misremembered. The final part of the road, impassible to vehicles for many years, is since 1986 part of the Jackrabbit Ski Trail.

Brown's funeral

His funeral, with open casket, and burial took place on December 8, 1859, at the John Brown Farm State Historic Site, near modern Lake Placid, New York, where his "body lies a-mouldering", as the Battle Hymn of the Republic says. "Quite a number" of local residents attended. Oliver's widow was present, but not the widow of Watson. It would be many years before their bodies, along with those of Ruth Brown's husband William Thompson and his brother Augustus Dauphin Thompson, were recovered and buried next to their father.

The company sang Brown's favorite hymn, "Blow ye the trumpet—Blow". Return, ye ransomed sinners, home." Eldest daughter Ruth accompanied on a melodeon, a wedding present from her father, later to occupy a niche in her home in Pasadena, California,

Rev. Joshua Young, from nearby Burlington, heard of the upcoming burial as the body passed through Rutland, and decided to attend, traveling all night—the moon was almost full—and arriving only hours before the ceremony. As he was the only clergyman present—others had declined—Phillips requested that he conduct the funeral service, and Young said he then "knew why God had sent [him] there". The reporter present, who took it down stenographically, called Young's impromptu opening prayer "impressive":

James McKim, who had accompanied Mrs. Brown in retrieving the body of her husband from Virginia, then offered remarks, and Wendell Phillips gave what Rev. Young called "one of his matchless speeches... Every hearer saw a great vision—one never to be forgotten". According to Phillips, "hereafter you will tell children standing at your knees, 'I saw John Brown buried, — I sat under his roof.'" Phillips "intimated that Massachusetts would yet possess the remains of John Brown."

Brown had requested that he be buried next to the large boulder near his farmhouse: "When I die, bury me by the big rock where I love to sit and read the word of God." As the body was lowered into the grave, Rev. Young recited the words of Paul just before his death, words John especially loved and which were inscribed in birch bark on the wall of a room in his house: "I have fought the good fight, I have finished my course, I have kept the faith. From now on there is reserved for me the crown of righteousness, which the Lord, the righteous judge, will give me on that day".  For this specifically, and in general for having presided over Brown's funeral, he found himself reviled upon his return home to Burlington. "I was called all manner of names. I was an anarchist, a traitor to my country, a blasphemer, and a 'vile associate of Garrison and Phillips.'" "The best thing I ever did was called the worst." He was eventually forced to resign his pulpit, and was told he would never get another ministerial position, which turned out not to be true.

Accompanying him back to Vermont, Wendell Phillips repeated his lecture, in a Town Hall full to overflowing, in Vergennes:

Mr. Phillips carried to Boston, from North Elba, a "large quantity of valuable matter", intended for Mr. Child's promised memoir of John Brown (which never appeared). This matter consisted of letters and other papers, and photographs of several members of the Brown and Thompson families. This material was then made available to the family's chosen biographer, James Redpath.

Memorial on July 4, 1860
His widow Mary soon complained to the press about "the multitude of letters addressed to her, for one purpose or another, by entire strangers, who have no claims upon her attention, and who seek to promote their own interest or gratify their curiosity, regardless of the restraints of delicacy and propriety."

On July 4, 1860, there was a memorial ceremony in honor of Brown at his farm. A Programme was issued announcing it; the family friends and biographers Richard J. Hinton and James Redpath signed them. This was the last time the living members of Brown's family would gather as a group. Those of his raiders still alive, except Tidd, also attended.

By 10 AM, 1,000 people were in attendance. The Declaration of Independence was read. Brown's favorite hymn, "Blow ye the trumpet, blow," was sung.

The "Orator of the Day", who stood atop the large boulder when speaking, was Luther Lee, a senior member of the U.S. abolitionist movement, born the same year as John Brown (1800). He spoke for two hours.

Thaddeus Hyatt attended, and spoke briefly. Letters apologizing for non-attendance were read from Thomas Wentworth Higginson, H. Ford Douglas, Rev. J. Sella Martin, James Redpath, F. B. Sanborn (who enclosed a hymn, which was also read), C. H. Brainard, and Frederick Douglass. Thoreau's "The Last Days of John Brown" was read in full. Brown's sons John Jr. and Owen, visiting from Ohio, also spoke. Others speaking were raiders Osborne Anderson, Barclay Coppoc, and Francis J. Meriam.

The family moves to California
In 1860, the only son at the farm was Salmon, born in 1836, married in 1857. The oldest boys, John Jr. and Jason, who, like Salmon, chose not to go to Harpers Ferry after their experiences in Kansas, were already farming in Ohio. Owen, escaping from the Harpers Ferry raid, joined them and remained in Ohio until the Civil War was over. Frederick was killed in Kansas; Oliver and Watson were killed at Harpers Ferry. Annie and Sarah were enrolled in Franklin Sanborn's school in Concord, Massachusetts; tuition was paid by George L. Stearns, one of the Secret Six.

It was lonely for Mary, and more so after Salmon departed early in 1862 to join the Union Army; he was sworn in as 2nd Lieutenant of the 96th Regiment New York Volunteers, but he soon resigned, as those under him, presumably pro-slavery men, complained over his head about having a son of John Brown as their leader. In 1863 she leased and in 1865 sold the farm, to Alexis Hinckley, a brother of Salmon's wife Abigail, for $800. The grave site was not sold, and it was written into the sale that everyone would be able to access John Brown's grave.

Accompanied by Salmon, his wife and two daughters, and Brown's daughters Sarah and Ellen, Mary set out in November 1863, driven by Lyman Epps to the new rail line at Keene, for John Jr.'s home at Put-in-Bay, Ohio. John Jr. joined Mary in complaining about the large number of curiosity seekers that visited him. "Our house has been like a well-patronized Hotel," he said.

Pushing on, Mary bought a farm in Decorah, Iowa, raising poultry and quail, and was joined there  by Annie, who had just spent six months teaching former slaves in Norfolk, Virginia. After one winter, the hardest on record as of that date, colder than anything they'd experienced in North Elba, the family set off further west, in three covered wagons, via the Mormon Trail, crossing the Mississippi at Council Bluffs, Iowa, then Fort Kearny, Nebraska, and Soda Springs, Idaho. Southern sympathizers attempted to kill them on the trip, and four of Salmon's Merino sheep—travelling in a wagon—were poisoned. The family received a military escort for several hundred miles.

"You will ask how I liked crossing the Plains," wrote Annie to her sister in 1864. "It will do for one six mouths of one's life, but I should hate to waste another by doing it over again. We had a remarkably good time, and enjoyed it much; did not suffer deprivations or otherwise, as I supposed we should; still, I do not think I could advise any one to undertake the journey."

The end of the trip, where they settled in the fall of 1864, after 25 weeks of travel, was Red Bluff, California. They were near destitute: "a hungry, almost barefoot, ragged lot". Residents in Red Bluff helped them with their immediate needs. "We were given a sack of flour and other groceries, and I was given a pair of shoes and cloth for a dress," recalled Annie. "Mr. [Salmon] Brown got a job at once grubbing out young oaks for forty dollars. He did the job in eight days and we felt rich. How I loved California."

A statewide subscription, in which California Governor Frederick Low participated, raised $450, bought land, and built her a small house. It is a California State Historic Landmark, although unmarked. Mary lived there from 1866 to 1870, working as nurse and midwife. Salmon started ranching nearby, with only two sheep that survived the trip, one ram and one ewe; when one was sheared, the quality of the wool made the newspaper. He bought on credit new sheep and a ranch of  near Corning, California. Annie (born 1843) taught in a school for Black children some distance away, boarding with a Black family, until the school was destroyed by arson. Sarah (born 1846) also taught school to Black children, then moved to San Francisco and worked for the U.S. Mint. Ellen (born 1854) attended the local school. However, hostility towards the Browns developed.

After six years Mary, Sarah, and Salmon and his family moved to Humboldt County. (Salmon's daughter says he left Red Bluff after two years.) He was described in the press as prosperous. Mary and Sarah lived in nearby Rohnerville. In 1881 they moved to Saratoga, California, in Santa Clara County, and were joined by Ellen, her husband James Fablinger, a teacher, and their four small girls. Salmon did not accompany them, and in 1889 leased  and 2,000 sheep. He added to the ranch, making it , and he and his partner had fourteen thousand sheep. However, the loss of 8,000 of them during the winter of 1890–1891 led him to abandon sheep raising. In 1893 he and his family moved to Salem, Oregon. Alone among the Brown children, he publicly defended his father at length. In 1902 he moved to Portland, Oregon, where he ended in economic distress, and committed suicide because of the condition of his health and the burden he felt he was to his aged wife. He is buried in the Grand Army of the Republic Cemetery. Mary, Sarah, and Ellen are buried in Madronia Cemetery in Saratoga, California.

Their farm near Saratoga, which the family only farmed two years, was in 1928 open as the "Historic John Brown Lodge" hotel, even though John never set foot in California and the Lodge was built after Mary's death. It later became Camp Stuart of the Boy Scouts of America; the Boy Scouts having closed the camp, in 1996 it was controlled by the Santa Clara County Parks and Recreation Department.

None of the Browns returned to visit the North Elba farm until the burial of Watson there, in 1882. Mary died in 1884.

References

John Brown (abolitionist)
Essex County, New York
Funerals in the United States
December 1859 events